Bismark Township is one of eighteen townships in Platte County, Nebraska, United States. The population was 438 at the 2020 census. A 2021 estimate placed the township's population at 433.

History
Bismark Township was established in 1871.

See also
County government in Nebraska

References

External links
City-Data.com

Townships in Platte County, Nebraska
Townships in Nebraska